Nimbus is the name given to seven different Thoroughbred racehorses as of 2007.

 Nimbus (French horse), French racehorse, foaled in 1910
 Nimbus (British horse), English racehorse and Epsom Derby winner, foaled in 1946
 Nimbus (USA), foaled 1930, 2nd in the 1933 Belmont Stakes